Kieran Tuntivate is a Thai-American distance runner, who specializes in the 10,000 metres. After running collegiately with Harvard University, Tuntivate turned professional with the Bowerman Track Club.

Career
Tuntivate was born in the Washington, DC, United States.

2018
Tuntivate's first major international result was at the 2018 Asian Games, where he finished fourth in the 10,000 metres in 30:29.04. The following year he won the 5000 and 10000 metres at the Southeast Asian Games.

2021
Tuntivate qualified for the 2020 Summer Olympics in Tokyo with his time of 27:17.14. In addition, he is the first Thai (mixed American) ever who entered 10,000 metres and finished rank 23 in 29.01.92.

International competitions

Personal bests
Outdoor
1500 metres – 3:47.36	(Swarthmore, PA (USA))
Mile – 3:57.87 (Lipscomb Academy, Nashville, TN (USA))
5000 metres – 13:42.75	(Griswold Stadium, Portland, OR (USA))
10000 metres - 27:17.14 (JSerra Catholic HS, San Juan Capistrano, CA (USA))

Indoor
1000 metres – 2:28.14 (Boston, MA (USA))
Mile – 3:57.36 (Boston Univ. Track & Tennis Center, Boston, MA (USA))
3000 metres – 7:49.15 (Boston Univ. Track & Tennis Center, Boston, MA (USA))
5000 metres – 13:08.41 (Boston Univ. Track & Tennis Center, Boston, MA (USA))

References

1997 births
Living people
Sportspeople from Wilmington, Delaware
Kieran Tuntivate
American male long-distance runners
Harvard Crimson men's cross country runners
Athletes (track and field) at the 2018 Asian Games
Competitors at the 2019 Southeast Asian Games
Kieran Tuntivate
Harvard Crimson men's track and field athletes
Athletes (track and field) at the 2020 Summer Olympics
Kieran Tuntivate
Asian Games medalists in athletics (track and field)
Kieran Tuntivate
Medalists at the 2018 Asian Games
Southeast Asian Games medalists in athletics